World of Outlaws: Sprint Cars is a racing video game for the PlayStation 3 and Xbox 360. It was developed by Big Ant Studios and published by THQ. It features 12 Tracks from the World of Outlaws schedule and 20 drivers such as, Steve Kinser and Donny Schatz. It features 8 player online racing with 5 multiplayer modes. In the US it was released for Xbox 360 on February 9, 2010 and the PlayStation 3 via the PlayStation Store on May 11, 2010. In Australia, it was released on June 21, 2010.

Tracks
The 12 tracks in the game are listed below.
The Dirt Track at Charlotte Motor Speedway
Knoxville Raceway
Eldora Speedway
Volusia Speedway Park
Williams Grove Speedway
Lernerville Speedway
Skagit Speedway
Dodge City Raceway Park
I-55 Raceway
Silver Dollar Speedway
Huset's Speedway
Cedar Lake Speedway

Drivers
There are 20 real life drivers in the game.
Steve Kinser
Donny Schatz
Joey Saldana
Jason Meyers
Ed Lynch Jr.
Craig Dollansky
Danny Lasoski
Jac Haudenschild
Jason Sides
Kraig Kinser
Lucas Wolfe
Sam Hafertepe Jr
Chad Kemenah
Terry McCarl
Daryn Pittman
Randy Hannagan
Kerry Madsen
Brian Brown
Chad Hillier
Tony Bruce Jr

Online Multiplayer Modes
The game has 5 multiplayer modes.
 Race
 Hot Spot
 Hot Spot Delivery
 Tag
 Bomb Tag

Each of these modes can be played 2 player offline or up to 8 player online.

References

World of Outlaws
2010 video games
PlayStation 3 games
PlayStation Network games
Xbox 360 games
THQ games
Racing video games
Sports video games set in the United States
Multiplayer and single-player video games
Video games developed in Australia
Big Ant Studios games